243 (The Wessex) Field Hospital is a unit of the Royal Army Medical Corps within the Army Reserve of the British Army.

History
The hospital was formed in 1999, through the amalgamation of 211th (Wessex) Field Hospital, and 219th (Wessex) Field Hospital, as 243 (The Wessex) Field Hospital. As a consequence of Army 2020, the unit now falls under 2nd Medical Brigade, and is paired with 33 Field Hospital.

Under the Future Soldier programme, the hospital will be redesignated as the 243rd (Wessex) Multi-Role Medical Regiment and come under 2nd Medical Group.

Current Structure
The hospital's current structure is as follows:
Headquarters, at Keynsham
A Detachment, at Keynsham and Gloucester
B Detachment, at Wyvern Barracks, Exeter
C Detachment, at Plymouth and Truro
D Detachment, at Portsmouth

Uniform 
The Wessex Wyvern Division Sign was used by the 43rd (Wessex) Infantry Division during the two world wars: a mythical creature said to lurk in the West Country.  The sign was re-introduced to the Army in mid-1993 with the 211th Field Hospital becoming the first unit to re-use the symbol on their combat jackets.  The sign was publicly worn for the first time on 24 October 1993 at the 75th Anniversary commemorations of the awards of the Croix de Guerre to the 24th Field Ambulance.

The use of the Croix-de-Guerre is granted for the 243rd Field Hospital, though it is no longer worn on battle dress or in the field following the adoption of the new Multi-Terrain Pattern in 2010.

See also 

 Official History of 243rd (Wessex) Field Hospital and its predecessors in the First World War on YouTube
 211th/219th/243rd Wessex Field Hospital Members Facebook Group

Footnotes

Military units and formations established in 1999
Units of the Royal Army Medical Corps